Edmond George Castro is a Belizean politician. He has represented the Belize Rural North constituency in the Belize House from 2008 to 2020. A member of the United Democratic Party, he also served as Minister of National Emergency Management in Belize.

References

Year of birth missing (living people)
Living people
United Democratic Party (Belize) politicians
Government ministers of Belize
Members of the Belize House of Representatives for Belize Rural North